Ossining  is a town located along the Hudson River in Westchester County, New York. The population was 40,061 at the time of the 2020 census. It contains two villages, the Village of Ossining and part of Briarcliff Manor, the rest of which is located in the Town of Mount Pleasant. Ossining is the location of Sing Sing maximum-security prison.

Geography
According to the United States Census Bureau, the town has a total area of 15.6 square miles (40.4 km2), of which 11.7 square miles (30.3 km2) is land and 3.9 square miles (10.1 km2) (25.06%) is water.

Ossining is bounded on the west by the Hudson River and on the north by the Croton River.

History 

Frederick Philipse bought the area which presently constitutes the Town of Ossining from the Sint Sinck Indians in 1685. The Sint Sinck were members of the Matinecock (Algonquin) tribe, who originally resided in the area of Cow Neck Peninsula on Long Island, New York. His Manor extended from Spuyten Duyvil Creek on the border between present-day Manhattan and the Bronx to the Croton River. The last Lord of the Manor, Frederick Philipse III, was a Loyalist in the American Revolutionary War who fled to England. The State of New York confiscated the manor in 1779.

In 1813, the village of Sing Sing was incorporated. Sing Sing Prison, now known as Sing Sing Correctional Facility, which is a maximum-security prison, opened in 1826. The prison was opened to replace the Newgate Prison that was located in New York City. In 1845, the New York State Legislature created a new town out of the northern part of what had been the Town of Mount Pleasant. A local Indian authority suggested the town be named Ossinsing, a different form of the name Sing Sing. One year later the last "s" was removed for ease in pronunciation. In 1881, the town considered changing its name to "Garfield Plains" to honor the recently assassinated President of the United States, James Garfield, but dropped the idea after the much larger city of White Plains in southern Westchester County objected. In 1901, to prevent confusion of goods made in the village with Sing Sing prison-made items, local officials had the village name changed to Ossining as well.

In 1902 an area east of the village of Ossining, then known as Whitson's Corners, was incorporated as the village of Briarcliff Manor.

The Jug Tavern and Scarborough Historic District are listed on the National Register of Historic Places.

Demographics

In the census of 2000, there were 36,534 people, 12,355 households, and 8,537 families residing in the town. The population density was 3,123.0 people per square mile (1,205.6/km2). There were 12,733 housing units at an average density of 1,088.4 per square mile (420.2/km2). The racial makeup of the town was 70.26% White, 14.28% Black or African American, 0.35% Native American, 4.54% Asian, 0.02% Pacific Islander, 7.34% from other races, and 3.21% from two or more races. Hispanic or Latino of any race were 19.93% of the population.

There were 12,355 households, out of which 33.1% had children under the age of 18 living with them, 54.4% were married couples living together, 10.7% had a female householder with no husband present, and 30.9% were non-families. Of all households 25.5% were made up of individuals, and 9.0% had someone living alone who was 65 years of age or older. The average household size was 2.64 and the average family size was 3.14.

In the town, the population was spread out, with 21.8% under the age of 18, 7.8% from 18 to 24, 34.5% from 25 to 44, 22.9% from 45 to 64, and 13.0% who were 65 years of age or older. The median age was 37 years. For every 100 females, there were 106.1 males. For every 100 females age 18 and over, there were 105.4 males.

The median income for a household in the town was $65,485, and the median income for a family was $81,943 (these figures had risen to $77,753 and $98,593 respectively as of a 2007 estimate). Males had a median income of $51,286 versus $40,618 for females. The per capita income for the town was $34,195. About 5.0% of families and 8.4% of the population were below the poverty line, including 8.3% of those under age 18 and 9.2% of those age 65 or over.

Government

The Town of Ossining is governed by a town supervisor and a four-member town board. It comprises two incorporated villages, Village of Ossining and Village of Briarcliff Manor, each of which has a mayor and a village board. Each village maintains its own police department and village justice court. In addition to the two incorporated villages, there is an unincorporated section of the town that is not part of either village. The unincorporated section of the town has its own highway department. Fire, EMS and water services are provided by either the Village of Ossining or the Village of Briarcliff Manor. Law enforcement services for the unincorporated section of the town are provided through an inter-municipal agreement with the Village of Ossining Police Department (the town's police department was disbanded in 2011).

Education
Ossining Union Free School District operates public schools, including Ossining High School.

The Ossining Public Library, originally chartered in 1893 as the Sing Sing Public Library, serves the residents of the Village and Town of Ossining, and of the Ossining School District. The current library collections include 110,000 books, 25,000 non-print items, and 300 newspaper and magazine titles. As a charter member of the 38-member Westchester Library System, the Ossining Public Library offers its patrons access to the more than one million holdings of the other county libraries. A $15.8-million building program was started in 2005 to replace the 1960s-era facility with a new  building. The new Ossining Public Library opened in March 2007 and added many new or enhanced services, including over 50 public Internet terminals, a 250-seat theater, an art gallery, and the county's first radio frequency (RFID) circulation system.

Notable people

 David T. Abercrombie, co-founder of Abercrombie & Fitch
 Jason Robert Brown, musical theatre composer, lyricist, and playwright
 Northern Calloway, actor, David on Sesame Street
 John Cheever, author
 John Chervokas, advertising executive
 Jennifer Cihi, singer (Broadway/television)
 Ted Daniel, jazz trumpeter
 Kara DioGuardi, singer-songwriter
Meredith Dixon, member of the New Mexico House of Representatives
 Peter Falk, actor
 Albert Fish, serial killer
 Mike da Fonte, professional soccer player 
 Anne Francis, actress
 Khalid Khannouchi, American record holder for the marathon
 Erica Leerhsen, actress
 Ingersoll Lockwood (1841–1918), lawyer and writer, author of the Baron Trump novels 
 Jamie Loeb (born 1995), tennis player
 Fonda Rae, singer
 Sonny Sharrock, jazz guitarist
 Jesse Lee Soffer, actor
 Matt Striker, WWE interviewer and commentator

In popular culture 
Don Draper, the primary protagonist of Mad Men, lives with his family in Ossining.

Gallery

References

External links

 Town of Ossining official web site
 Town of Ossining public safety
 Village of Ossining
 Ossining Public Library
 Ossining.com: Ossining, NY's Hometown Web-newspaper
 Hudson Valley Arts and Science
 InOssining.com: Ossining events, parks, neighborhoods and tours
Tocqueville in Ossining - Segment from C-SPAN's Alexis de Tocqueville Tour

 
Towns in Westchester County, New York
Towns in the New York metropolitan area